Tabanocella denticornis is a species of horse flies in the family Tabanidae.

Distribution
Mozambique, Zimbabwe.

References

Tabanidae
Taxa named by Christian Rudolph Wilhelm Wiedemann
Diptera of Africa
Insects described in 1828